Gregory Stuart Lake (10 November 1947 – 7 December 2016) was an English musician, singer, and songwriter. He gained prominence as a founding member of the progressive rock bands King Crimson and Emerson, Lake & Palmer (ELP).

Born and brought up in Dorset, Lake began to play the guitar at the age of 12 and wrote his first song, "Lucky Man", at the same age. He became a full-time musician at 17, playing in several rock bands until his friend and fellow Dorset guitarist Robert Fripp invited him to join King Crimson as lead singer and bassist. They found commercial success with their influential debut album, In the Court of the Crimson King (1969). Lake left the band in 1970 and achieved significant success in the 1970s and beyond as the singer, guitarist, bassist, and producer of ELP. As a member of ELP, Lake wrote and recorded several popular songs including "Lucky Man" and "From the Beginning". Both songs entered the UK and US singles charts.

Lake launched a solo career, beginning with his 1975 single "I Believe in Father Christmas" which reached number two in the UK. He went on to release three solo albums with his Greg Lake Band and guitarist Gary Moore, recorded 1981 through 1983 (two studio albums, one live album). As well as collaborating and performing with other artists and with various groups in the 1980s, he had occasional ELP reunions in the 1990s and in 2010, and toured regularly as a solo artist into the 21st century. He also sponsored other artists, producing their recordings and helping them to get recording contracts. He also was a fundraiser for the National Center for Missing & Exploited Children. He died on 7 December 2016 in London, of pancreatic cancer, at the age of 69.

Early life 
Greg Lake was born on 10 November 1947 in the Parkstone area of Poole in Dorset, to Harry, an engineer, and Pearl, a housewife. He grew up in the residential suburb of Oakdale. Speaking about his childhood, Lake said he was "born in an asbestos prefab housing unit" into a "very poor" family, and remembered several cold winters at home, but credits his parents for sending him money and food during his time as a struggling musician. He later described his upbringing as a happy one.

Lake discovered rock and roll in 1957 when he bought Little Richard's "Lucille". At the age of 12, he first learned to play the guitar and wrote his first song, "Lucky Man", which he didn't write down, simply committing it to memory. He named his mother, a pianist, as his initial musical influence and she bought Lake a second hand guitar to learn on. Lake then took guitar lessons from Don Strike, who had a shop in Westbourne. Strike taught him "these awful Bert Weedon things", reading musical notation exercises with violin pieces by Niccolò Paganini, and playing 1930s pop tunes, the latter of which became an influence on Lake at the time. After roughly one year with Strike, Lake ended his tuition as he wished to learn songs by the Shadows, a favourite band of his, but Strike "wouldn't have any of it". Lake's second guitar was a pink Fender Stratocaster.

Lake attended Oakdale Junior School followed by Henry Harbin Secondary Modern School, and left the latter in 1963 or 1964. He then took up work loading and unloading cargo at the Poole docks, and as a draughtsman for a short period. Lake then decided to become a full-time musician at the age of 17.

Career

Early bands 
Lake joined his first band, Unit Four, playing cover songs as their singer and guitarist.
 Following their split in 1965, Lake and Unit Four bassist Dave Genes formed another covers group, the Time Checks, until 1966. He then became a member of the Shame, where he is featured on their single, "Don't Go Away Little Girl", written by Janis Ian. During his stay in Carlisle for a gig, Lake contracted pneumonia and continued to perform on stage. His bandmates refused to drive back home that night, leaving Lake to sleep in the van where he "woke up blue ... When we got home I was nearly dead ... That was probably the worst I went through". Following a brief stint in the Shy Limbs, by 1968 Lake was involved with the Gods, based in Hatfield, which he described as "a very poor training college", but the group secured a residency at the Marquee Club in London. Lake left the group in 1968 over creative differences as the band were to enter the recording studio. Their keyboardist Ken Hensley later said that Lake "was far too talented to be kept in the background".

King Crimson 
In the 1960s, Lake formed a friendship with future King Crimson co-founder and guitarist Robert Fripp, who was also from Dorset and had also received lessons from Don Strike, and saw Lake perform in Unit Four in Poole. Fripp was asked to be a roadie for a gig at Ventnor, Isle of Wight, but no audience turned up. Consequently, Lake and Fripp decided to just play tunes from their guitar lessons that Strike had taught them.

Fripp formed King Crimson since his previous group, Giles, Giles and Fripp was not commercially successful, and their record company suggested getting a proper lead singer. He chose Lake for this role, but asked him to play bass instead of guitar to avoid having to get a bass player in the group. This marked Lake's first time playing the instrument as he had primarily been a guitarist for the previous eleven years. Though Peter Sinfield was the band's lyricist, Lake had some involvement in the lyrics for their debut album In the Court of the Crimson King. After their contracted producer Tony Clarke walked away from the project, Lake produced the album. Released in October 1969, the album was an immediate commercial and critical success, as Lake recalled: "There was this huge wave of response. The audiences were really into us because we were an underground thing – the critics loved us because we offered something fresh".

King Crimson supported In the Court of the Crimson King with a tour of the UK and the US, with some of the shows featuring rock band the Nice as the opening act. During the US leg, Lake struck up a friendship with Nice keyboardist Keith Emerson; the two shared similar musical interests and talked about the benefits of forming a new group. When King Crimson returned to the UK in early 1970, Lake agreed to sing on the band's second album, In the Wake of Poseidon, and appear on the music television show Top of the Pops with them, performing the song "Cat Food".

Emerson, Lake & Palmer 

In April 1970, Lake left King Crimson and reunited with Emerson, along with drummer Carl Palmer of the Crazy World of Arthur Brown and Atomic Rooster, to form the progressive rock supergroup, Emerson, Lake & Palmer. Lake began with a Fender bass before he switched to a Gibson Ripper. As well as bass, Lake contributed acoustic and electric guitar work to Emerson, Lake & Palmer, and his voice had a wider and more diverse range than anything the Nice had previously recorded. Emerson, Lake & Palmer became one of the most successful groups in the 1970s.

Lake became known for performing on a Persian carpet on stage, refusing to take to the stage unless it were present; it was often cited as an icon of the band's lavish and egocentric stagepieces. Years later Lake confessed that the carpet was purchased to disguise a rubber mat he used to alleviate his fear of electrocution, which he developed after an incident with a live microphone. Sinfield, who went with Lake to purchase the carpet, felt that this was only half the story, and said that Lake was driven to keep up with Emerson's extravagant equipment: "He was one of those classic keep-up-with-the-Joneses cases." In addition, Lake would change his guitar strings after each show on tour.

Emerson, Lake & Palmer conflicted between Emerson's interest in complex, classically-influenced music and Lake's more straightforward rock tastes. Lake complained that Emerson chose to play in keys that were not a good fit for his voice. During the making of the band's second album Tarkus, Lake initially rejected the title track, but was persuaded to record it following a band meeting with management, which ended in the addition of an original Lake tune, "Battlefield", into the suite. Lake's track "From the Beginning", released on Trilogy in 1972, had no particular source of inspiration; "I just felt an inspiration to do it, and it flowed through me in a natural way. My hands fell upon these very unusual chords ... It was kind of a gift". It was released as a single, and reached number 39 in the US.

In 1974, Emerson, Lake & Palmer took a break in activity. Lake used this time to focus on his family life, travel, and write and release music. By then the band were tax exiles and relocated to Switzerland, France, Canada and the Bahamas as they were restricted to two months' stay in England a year. In March 1977, the band released Works Volume 1, a double album, with each member of the group getting one side of an album for his solo music, and the fourth side for the group to work together. Lake wrote five acoustic songs with lyrical assistance from Sinfield, with a conscious effort not to record "just ballads" and attempt a wider variety of musical styles. He then incorporated orchestral overdubs to the songs. One of them, "C'est la Vie", was released as a single. Lake called the album the "beginning of the end" of the band, as he no longer produced their future albums, neither of which were a "really innovative record". In November 1977, the band released Works Volume 2.

The band split up in 1979 following the unsuccessful album Love Beach, an album the group were contractually obliged to record. The group reformed for a number of years in the mid-1990s and released two albums, Black Moon in 1992 and In The Hot Seat in 1994, before permanently disbanding except for a forty-year anniversary one-off gig in 2010 at London's High Voltage Festival.

Solo career and other projects 
In 1975, while still a member of ELP, Lake achieved solo chart success when his single, "I Believe in Father Christmas", reached number two on the UK Singles Chart. It has become a Yuletide perennial. In the UK, the single sold over 13,000 copies in two days.

Several months following the break-up of ELP in 1979, Lake began to write new songs and had "put down a tremendous amount of material" for his first solo album. He travelled to Los Angeles and worked with a group of session musicians to develop his songs further, but he found a lack of personality in the music, though not at the fault of the performers. Lake realised he wished to play as part of a group, and began to assemble members of the Greg Lake Band. The result, Greg Lake, was released in September 1981 on Chrysalis Records, and reached number 62 in both the UK and the US. The debut concert for the tour of the album took place in August 1981 at the Reading Festival, with bandmates Gary Moore on guitar, Ted McKenna on drums, Tommy Eyre on keyboards, and Tristram Margetts on bass. A concert at the Hammersmith Odeon during the tour in 1981, broadcast live on the King Biscuit Flower Hour, was released as a live album in 1995.

Lake's second solo album Manoeuvres was released in July 1983. He disbanded the Greg Lake Band soon after completing it, without promoting or touring the album, and split with his record company. In a 1997 interview, he explained his decision: "It was a weird time for me, and for the music business. I was pressured into writing songs that the record company thought radio programmers wanted to hear. Hence, there was not the passion the first album had. There were some nice ballads, but the record lacked the pure vision that a hit album needs to succeed." He gave further insight in 2011: "It was great to be the rhythm guitar player in that line-up. Gary is a fabulous player, and the bass was covered properly. The problem was the solo albums really lacked direction. I was lost in a way. Once you've been in a band like ELP, if you try a solo career you can do it, but the public voted 'You're part of ELP. That's who you are'...  When you try and search for an alternative identity, it's difficult. For a long while, I was kind of lost and would try different things. It was fun, but also a bit here, there and everywhere." Adding to the decision, lead guitarist Gary Moore had written solo material that brought him a recording contract: "I was working with Greg Lake for two years during '81 and '82 and we did two albums. At the time I was with him, I was writing songs ... I did some demos after the U.S. tour with Greg to see what would happen, and I got a deal with Atlantic. I really wanted to get out on my own at that stage, and I wanted these songs recorded – they weren't suitable for Greg... so I set up a deal with Virgin, and went in and did 'Corridors Of Power'. We didn't even set out to form a band, but the album took off, so we went on tour."

In October 1983, at friend Carl Palmer's request, Lake briefly joined Palmer in the 1980s supergroup Asia, to replace fellow King Crimson alumnus John Wetton for four scheduled concerts in Japan. Lake agreed and spent six weeks learning Asia's songs, culminating in his performance in the "Asia in Asia" concert at the Nippon Budokan Hall in Tokyo, 6 December 1983, the first concert broadcast over satellite to MTV in the United States, and later made into a home video. Lake left the group after the tour, having joined as a favor for the Japanese concerts only.

In 1986, he and Keith Emerson decided to re-form Emerson, Lake & Palmer to record another album. However, Carl Palmer continued to have commitments to Asia, so Lake and Emerson auditioned other artists. They found good rapport with drummer Cozy Powell, and recorded their eponymous album Emerson, Lake & Powell with him.

In 2001, Lake toured as a member of the seventh incarnation of Ringo Starr & His All-Starr Band.

In 2003, Lake played bass on The Who song "Real Good Looking Boy". The group's usual bassist Pino Palladino was touring at the time of recording, and Lake was asked to play bass.

In 2005, Lake toured Germany and the UK with his group, the Greg Lake Band, which now included David Arch on keyboards, Florian Opahle on guitar, Trevor Barry on bass, and Brett Morgan on drums. The tour was sponsored by UK entertainer and long-term ELP fan, Jim Davidson.  But the shows were not a sell-out, the US leg was cancelled, and the two men then fell out.

In 2006, Lake played as a member of the supergroup the RD Crusaders in aid for charity. Lake performed "Karn Evil 9" with the Trans-Siberian Orchestra at several shows. He was a special guest on their album Night Castle (2009).

In 2010, Lake and Emerson completed an acoustic world tour, performing ELP songs. The tour got off to a bad start following a backstage altercation between the two, but "we completed the tour and it was very happy. We actually ended up enjoying ourselves". That July, Lake joined Emerson and Palmer for a one-off gig from Emerson, Lake & Palmer at the High Voltage Festival in Victoria Park, London, to commemorate the band's fortieth anniversary. The concert was released on CD, DVD, and Blu-ray as High Voltage. It was the final performance by the group. Lake wished to continue touring, but claimed his bandmates "didn't want to", thus ending such plans.

Lake continued to tour solo in the 2010s. His Songs of a Lifetime Tour began in 2012 which featured songs of his career and those by his favourite artists, including Elvis Presley and Johnny Kidd & the Pirates. The tour ended in December of that year and produced the live albums, Songs of a Lifetime (2013) and "Live in Piacenza" (2017).

On 9 January 2016, he was awarded an honorary degree in music and lyrics composition by Conservatorio Nicolini in Piacenza, Italy, the first degree awarded by any conservatory, ever.

Lake spent several years writing his autobiography Lucky Man, originally planned to be published in 2012 but eventually released posthumously in June 2017.

On 19 June 2017, the Municipality of Zoagli (Genoa) Italy awarded the Honorary Citizenship post mortem to Greg Lake and engraved a marble plaque that is next to Castello Canevaro where the musician performed on 30 November 2012.

In the last years he worked on producing for Manticore "Moonchild" by Annie Barbazza and Max Repetti: an album where some of his most iconic songs were arranged in a advantgarde/contemporary mood, just for piano and voice.

Personal life and death 
In late 1974, Lake moved from a flat in Cornwall Gardens in Kensington, London to a home near Windsor. Lake later lived in the Kingston and Richmond areas of Greater London with his wife. The couple had one daughter.

Lake died in London on 7 December 2016, at the age of 69, after suffering from cancer. His manager announced the news on Twitter, describing Lake's battle with the illness as "long and stubborn". Numerous fellow musicians paid tribute, including Rick Wakeman and Steve Hackett, Ringo Starr, John Wetton, Opeth's Mikael Åkerfeldt, Jethro Tull's Ian Anderson and ELP drummer Carl Palmer. Lake's death occurred nine months after that of Keith Emerson, leaving Palmer the only living member of Emerson, Lake & Palmer.

Discography

Solo
Compilations
The Greg Lake Retrospective: From the Beginning (1997)
From the Underground: The Official Bootleg (1998)
From the Underground 2: Deeper Into the Mine – An Official Greg Lake Bootleg (2003)
The Anthology: A Musical Journey (2020)

Singles
"I Believe in Father Christmas" / "Humbug" (1975), 
"C'est La Vie" / "Jeremy Bender" (1977)   
"Watching Over You" / "Hallowed Be Thy Name" (1977)
"Love You Too Much" / "Someone"  (UK/Europe 1981)
"For Those who dare" / "Love you too much" (Germany 1981)
"Let Me Love You Once" / "Retribution Drive" (USA 1981)  
"It Hurts" / "Retribution Drive" (UK/Europe 1982)
"Famous Last Words" / "I Don't Know Why I Still Love You" (Portugal 1983)

DVDs
Greg Lake: Live In Concert (2006)
Welcome Backstage (2006)
Greg Lake Live in Piacenza (2017) exclusively with the limited edition box set of the album with the same title.

As producer
 Spontaneous Combustion - "Just A Dream" {aka "Unknown Ballad" attributed to Emerson, Lake & Palmer, recorded December 1970 or January 1971, released as a bonus track on the 2012 Tarkus reissue} (2012)
 Spontaneous Combustion - Lonely Singer / 200 Lives / Leaving (1971) 7" single
 Spontaneous Combustion - self-titled (1972)
 Pete Sinfield - Still (1973)
 The King's Singers – Strawberry Fields Forever (1978) 7" single
 Annie Barbazza & Max Repetti - Moonchild (2018)
 Annie Barbazza - Vive (2018) (Track "Boite A Tisane")

References

Bibliography

External links

 

1947 births
2016 deaths
20th-century English bass guitarists
21st-century English bass guitarists
Acoustic guitarists
Asia (band) members
Chrysalis Records artists
Deaths from cancer in England
Deaths from pancreatic cancer
English male guitarists
Male bass guitarists
English baritones
English rock bass guitarists
English rock guitarists
English rock singers
English songwriters
King Crimson members
Lead guitarists
People from Poole
Progressive rock guitarists
Progressive rock bass guitarists
Progressive rock musicians
Emerson, Lake & Palmer members
Emerson, Lake & Powell members
Ringo Starr & His All-Starr Band members